The Belgorod Oblast Duma is the regional parliament of Belgorod Oblast, a federal subject of Russia. A total of 50 deputies are elected for five-year terms.

Elections

2015

2020

References 

Politics of Belgorod Oblast
Belgorod Oblast